Toomas Krõm (born 22 September 1971 in Tallinn) is a former  professional footballer from Estonia, playing as a forward. Born in Tallinn, he twice became topscorer of the Premier Estonian League, named Meistriliiga: in 1999 and 2000. Krõm obtained a total number of 11 caps for the Estonia national football team during his career.

References

1971 births
Living people
Footballers from Tallinn
Soviet footballers
Estonian footballers
Estonia international footballers
Estonian expatriate footballers
Association football forwards
Expatriate footballers in Finland
Estonian expatriate sportspeople in Finland
FCI Levadia Tallinn players
Nõmme Kalju FC players
FC Flora players
FF Jaro players
Meistriliiga players
Veikkausliiga players
JK Tervis Pärnu players